Enteromius taeniurus is a species of ray-finned fish in the genus Enteromius. It has a body length of about 12 cm and is classified as vulnerable by the IUCN. It is endemic to Cameroon. It is a freshwater tropical fish.

References

Endemic fauna of Cameroon
Enteromius
Taxa named by George Albert Boulenger
Fish described in 1903